Alexandre Paulikevitch (born February 20, 1982, in Beirut, Lebanon) is a Lebanese artist living in Beirut, Lebanon. He is one of very few male Arab belly dancers, and is known for his thought provoking work and the social issues he tackles through his art. He studied at the University of Paris VIII majoring in Theater and Dance.

He returned to Beirut in 2006, where he is now permanently based, and has since "been creating spaces of reflection on Middle-Eastern dance through his work as a choreographer, a teacher and a performer". Today he specializes in contemporary Baladi dance, a new dance form he has created and divulged.

Early life and career
Paulikevitch was born in Lebanon where he grew up in a conservative Armenian Christian neighborhood of Beirut. He embraced his sexuality early-on and came out as a homosexual man to his friends and family at the age of 16. 
His solo debut in Beirut was in 2009 with “Mouhawala Oula” (Arabic for "First Try") with which he begins to challenge gender stereotypes.

Homosexuality 
Although a relatively progressive country in the Middle East, homosexuality has not yet been decriminalized in Lebanon. As a male with a feminine demeanor, he is often the target of derogatory catcalls when in public. In one of his first solo shows, entitled Tajwal, Paulikevitch dances to a compilation of insults directed at him on the streets of Beirut, turning his suffering into art.

Gender 
Paulikevitch's work also redefines "gender roles through oriental dance". As a male dancer of Baladi, he uses his body to question gender stereotypes in the Middle East.

Activism 
Beyond his dance practice, Paulikevitch is an active member of the civil society in Lebanon and a visible participant of multiple civil rights marches and protests. During the 2019–2020 Lebanese protests, also known locally as the October Revolution, Alexandre was violently arrested and detained by the riot police after participating in a public protest on the eve of January 14, 2020. He was summoned to military court, setting a precedent in a series of military tribunal convocations for citizens arrested during the protests. Paulikevitch's experience of arrest and detention inspired his show "A'alehom", during which he expresses his personal grief and the difficult year that was 2020. His work has been described as a "call to revolution", and he has been called the "militant dancer."

Baladi career
Known as "the most famous male Baladi dancer", Paulikevitch is also perceived as the "precursor" of the dance form. His shows are often inspired by personal experiences of traumas, and have been received by audiences and critics with great success. He is one of few Arab baladi dancers to perform on international stages and as part of large dance festivals. In 2022, his performance "Cabaret Welbeek" was selected as the show to watch in the Festival LEGS, and was described as "the peak of a playful mix between joy, poetry and subversion."

Baladi appellation
One of the main missions Paulikevitch claims for himself is to battle what he describes as 'the colonial designation' of 'Belly Dance'. In describing his work, he aims to reclaim the native significance and original Egyptian appellation Baladi — Arabic for my country or land. His main critique is that the term 'Belly Dance' was created through the colonial gaze to eroticize this dance, condemning it as female and suggestive. As a male Arab dancer within this tradition, he combats these stereotypes, thus reclaiming a space for a male figure in a female dominated world. In 2017, he influenced the Centre Pompidou to use the term "Baladi" instead of Belly Dance in their show "Move / Hips don't lie", a retrospective of the dance's history.

Features
Paulikevitch was featured locally and internationally in many outlets. This includes an episode of the Netflix series We Speak Dance, hosted by Vandana Hart and filmed in Beirut; a New York Times article, "Coming Out in Lebanon" about openly queer and transsexual individuals in Lebanon, a BBC Culture documentary, The Male Belly Dancer Fighting Gender Stereotypes; and a short documentary about his food cooking and preservation techniques entitled "Tastes of Loss" by Romy Lynn Attieh.

Selected works

Solo shows 

 “Mouhawala Oula” (Arabic: محاولة اولة), Debut: 2009
 Tajwal (Arabic: تجوال), Debut: 2011
 ELGHA (Arabic: إلغاء), Debut: 2013
 Baladi ya Wad (Arabic: بلدي يا واد), Debut: 2015
 A'alehom (Arabic: عليهم), Debut: 2020
 Cabaret Welbeek (Arabic: كاباري والبيك), Debut: 2022

Collaborative shows 
 Poster session / school - Festival d'Avignon, a collaboration with dancers/choreographers: Christine De Smedt, Simone Forti, Xavier Le Roy, Mette Ingvartsen; directors: Jan Ritsema et Cyril Teste; rapper: DGIZ; author and playwright: Bojana Cvejic; essayist: Charlotte Nordmann; and director of the École supérieure d'art d'Avignon (ESAA): Jean-Marc Ferrari, Debut: 2011
 SKINOUT, a collaboration with Cecilia Bengolea, François Chaignaud, Ylva Falk, Elisa Yvelin, Naïs Haidar, Alex Mugler, Debut: 2012 
 Palais de Femme, a collaboration with Joelle Khoury and Chaghig Arzoumanian, Debut: 2014
 Dresse le Pour moi (Arabic: فأدِّبْهُ لي), a collaboration with Nancy Naous, Debut: 2018  
 The Last Distance, a collaboration with Leen Hashem, Debut: 2018

See also
LGBT rights in Lebanon
Belly dance

References

Lebanese people of Armenian descent
Armenian Christians
Belly dancers
Lebanese dancers
1982 births
Living people
Artists from Beirut
LGBT dancers
University of Paris alumni
21st-century LGBT people